Norman George Lloyd Roberts McDermid  ( 5 March 1927 - 30 September 2014) was an English Anglican priest.

Early life
The son of Lloyd Roberts and Annie McDermid, he was educated at St Peter's School, York, St Edmund Hall, Oxford and Wells Theological College.

Religious life
McDermid was ordained deacon in 1951, and priest in 1952. After  curacies in Leeds he held incumbencies in Bramley, Kirkby Overblow and Knaresborough. He was Archdeacon of Richmond from 1983 to 1993.

References

1927 births
Archdeacons of Richmond
Alumni of Wells Theological College
Alumni of St Edmund Hall, Oxford
2014 deaths
People educated at St Peter's School, York